Il Mitridate Eupatore (Mithridates Eupator) is an opera seria in five acts by the Italian composer Alessandro Scarlatti with a libretto by Girolamo Frigimelica Roberti. It was first performed, with the composer conducting, at the Teatro San Giovanni Grisostomo, Venice, on 5 January 1707. A failure at its premiere, Mitridate Eupatore is now considered one of the finest of Scarlatti's operas.

Roles

Synopsis
In the ancient kingdom of Pontus, Farnace has seized the throne, killing the king and marrying his wife, Stratonica. The murdered king's daughter, Laodice, has been married to the ruined nobleman, Nicomede, now reduced to working as a cowherd, while her brother, Mitridate Eupatore, has taken refuge in Egypt. Mitridate and his wife, Issicratea, arrive at the court of Pontus disguised as Egyptian ambassadors. They promise Mitridate's head to the usurping king and queen in return for peace between Egypt and Pontus. Mitridate's mother assents to the death of her own son. Mitridate meets his sister Laodice and reveals his true identity. Mitridate and Issicratea assassinate Farnace and Stratonica, and Nicomede announces to the people the return of their rightful king.

Performances
The opera was performed in July 2017 at the Festival de Beaune by Thibault Noally and his ensemble Les Accents.

References

Further reading
 The Viking Opera Guide, ed. Amanda Holden (Viking, 1993)
 Work details, Magazine de l'opéra baroque (in French)

Operas by Alessandro Scarlatti
Italian-language operas
Opera seria
1707 operas
Operas
Operas set in antiquity